Swan galaxias is a name for two species of fish in Australia:
Galaxias fontanus, found in Tasmania
Galaxiella munda,  found in southwest Australia